The Conflict is a 1916 American silent drama film directed by Ralph Ince and starring Lucille Lee Stewart,  Huntley Gordon and Wilfred Lytell.

Cast
 Lucille Lee Stewart as Madeleine Turner
 Jessie Miller as Jeanette Harcourt
 Huntley Gordon as Henry Mortimer
 Wilfred Lytell as Paul Moraunt 
 Frank Currier as John Turner
 John S. Robertson as 	Fred Weyburn 
 Richard Turner as Philip Lynch

References

Bibliography
 Connelly, Robert B. The Silents: Silent Feature Films, 1910-36, Volume 40, Issue 2. December Press, 1998.

External links
 

1916 films
1916 drama films
1910s English-language films
American silent feature films
Silent American drama films
Films directed by Ralph Ince
American black-and-white films
Vitagraph Studios films
1910s American films